Thurgood Marshall High School is a public high school located in Missouri City, Texas and is a part of the Fort Bend Independent School District.

Marshall, serving grades 9 through 12, serves sections of Missouri City and a portion of the extraterritorial jurisdiction of Stafford, including sections of Fifth Street. A small portion of the City of Houston is in the school's boundary.

Marshall was named after Thurgood Marshall, the first African-American to serve in the Supreme Court of the United States. The mascot is the Buffalo Soldier represented by the Marshall Buffalo and the school colors are black and gold.

History

Marshall opened on August 15, 2002 and was dedicated on October 13 of the same year.

Marshall was FBISD’s Ninth Comprehensive School.

Marshall is magnetized for its three career academies, Electronic Engineering (EE), Geographical Information Systems (GIS) (Discontinued), and Fire Science Technology. The EE Academy's FIRST Robotics team has received distinguished honors from FIRST in its six years of existence. In the Fall of 2009 they are proposed to open the first International Baccalaureate program in Fort Bend Independent School District.

The Air Force JROTC Unit at Thurgood Marshall High School earned the 2009-2010 Distinguished Unit Award.

During the 2009-2010 school year, Marshall was rated as a recognized school for the first time in school history.

Attendance zone
A Houston Housing Authority (HHA) public housing complex, Willow Park Apartments, is assigned to Marshall High.

Athletics

Men's

Football
2019 State Finalist (5A/D2)
Basketball
Baseball
Track & Field
Golf
Swimming
Tennis

Women's
Volleyball
Track & Field
Basketball
Swimming
Softball
Tennis

Feeder patterns
The following elementary schools feed into Marshall:
 Armstrong
 Glover 
 Hunters Glen
 E.A. Jones

The following middle schools feed into Marshall:
 Missouri City

Notable alumni
Antwon Blake (class of 2008): American football player in the NFL since 2012
Aubrey Coleman (class of 2005): professional basketball player since 2010
Knile Davis (class of 2009): American football player in the NFL since 2013
Kendall Sheffield (class of 2015): American football player for the Ohio State University
DeAndré Washington (class of 2011): American football player in the NFL since 2016
C. J. Webster (class of 2005): professional basketball player since 2010

References

External links

 

Fort Bend Independent School District high schools
Magnet schools in Texas
Educational institutions established in 2002
2002 establishments in Texas
Missouri City, Texas